Maturino is both a given name and a surname. Notable people with the name include:

Given names
Maturino Blanchet (1892-1974), Italian Roman Catholic bishop
Maturino da Firenze (1490-1528), Italian painter

Middle names
Ángel Maturino Reséndiz (1960-2006), Mexican serial killer